Ente Mohangal Poovaninju is a 1982 Indian Malayalam-language romance film written and directed by Bhadran (in his directorial debut). Starring Shankar, Menaka and Mohanlal. The film features music composed by V. Dakshinamoorthy. The film was remade in Tamil as Isai Paadum Thendral.

Plot

Prashant (Shankar), a wealthy bachelor, grows tired of his wealth and moves to a village to start a new life as a commoner. There, he meets and falls in love with Sreedevi (Menaka), a middle-class girl.

Prashant decides to marry Sreedevi but his father finds out the truth and vehemently opposes the relationship, as he wants his son to marry Baby (Kalaranjini) who belongs to a similarly wealthy family like his. Aided by his best friend Vinu (Mohanlal), Prashant finally convinces his father to agree to the marriage. But disaster strikes on the day of the wedding as Baby, who was actually in love with Prashant, kills Sreedevi by mixing poison in her drink.

Several months later, a visibly distraught Prashant is being taken care of by Baby. Prashant's father sees this and arranges for Baby to be married to Prashant so that his son can find peace, a decision seconded by Vinu. However, on the night after their wedding, Prashant reveals  to Baby that he had known for some time that it was Baby who poisoned Sreedevi, and had mixed the same poison in the milk she had given him, thereby taking away the life with him she had so desperately wanted. The film ends with Prashant breathing his last with his memories of Sreedevi.

Cast

Soundtrack

The soundtrack was composed by V. Dakshinamoorthy. It also had two classical tracks picturised on Shankar.

Release
The film was released on 26 November 1982.

References

External links
 
 Watch movie on Eros Now

1982 films
1980s Malayalam-language films
Indian drama films
Malayalam films remade in other languages
1982 directorial debut films
Films directed by Bhadran
Films scored by V. Dakshinamoorthy
1982 drama films